Diacylglycerol O-acyltransferase 2 (DGAT2) is a protein that in humans is encoded by the DGAT2 gene.

Function

This gene encodes one of two enzymes which catalyzes the final reaction in the synthesis of triglycerides in which diacylglycerol is covalently bound to long chain fatty acyl-CoAs. 

The encoded protein catalyzes this reaction at low concentrations of magnesium chloride while the other enzyme has high activity at high concentrations of magnesium chloride. Multiple transcript variants encoding different isoforms have been found for this gene.

References

Further reading